Bombus rupestris is a species of cuckoo bumblebee present in most of Europe except Iceland. In the Balkans it is found in montane and alpine habitats northwards from Central Greece. It is also found in Turkey.

Description
The bumblebee is black, with the last abdominal segments coloured orange-red.

Due to its parasitic lifestyle, no workers exist.

Behaviour
Bombus rupestris is found in flower-rich habitats, such as meadows and along hedgerows. The bumblebee parasitizes the nests of the red-tailed bumblebee, B. lapidarius, whose queen is killed or subjugated.

References

Bumblebees
Hymenoptera of Europe
Insects described in 1793